Luc Van Hoyweghen (1 January 1929 – 30 June 2013) was a Belgian football forward who was a member of the Belgium national team at the 1954 FIFA World Cup. However, he never earned a cap for Belgium. He also played for R. Daring Club Molenbeek.

References

External links
FIFA profile

1929 births
Belgian footballers
Association football forwards
1954 FIFA World Cup players
2013 deaths
People from Dendermonde
Footballers from East Flanders